HMS Oswald was an  built for the Royal Navy during the 1920s.

Construction and career
She was laid down by Vickers-Armstrongs at Barrow-in-Furness on 30 May 1927, launched on 19 June 1928 and commissioned on 1 May 1929.

Loss
Oswald left Alexandria, Egypt, for a patrol east of Sicily on 19 July 1940. On 30 July, she spotted a convoy of several merchant ships. Her attack on the convoy was not successful and she was spotted by the convoy's escorting destroyers. Subsequently on 1 August Oswald was rammed and sunk by the Italian destroyer  while on patrol south of Calabria; 52 crewmen were rescued by Italian warships and 3 were lost.

Citations

Bibliography

 
 

 

1927 ships
Ships built in Barrow-in-Furness
Odin-class submarines of the Royal Navy
World War II submarines of the United Kingdom
Maritime incidents in August 1940
World War II shipwrecks in the Mediterranean Sea
Lost submarines of the United Kingdom
Submarines sunk by Italian warships